Francis Folliott (1667–1701) was an Irish Member of Parliament.

Biography
He was a younger son of John Ffolliott of Ballyshannon by his wife Johanna, daughter of Dr Edward Synge; John Folliott MP was his older brother. He sat in the Irish House of Commons for Ballyshannon from 1692 to 1693 and from 1695 to 1699. By his wife Letitia, daughter of Sir James Cuffe and Alice Aungier, he was the father of John Folliott, also an MP.

References

1667 births
1701 deaths
Irish MPs 1692–1693
Irish MPs 1695–1699
Members of the Parliament of Ireland (pre-1801) for County Donegal constituencies